Norman N. Green (born June 12, 1934) is a shopping mall developer and owner from Calgary, Alberta. He was an original director and one of the principal investors in Sage Telecom, a private, telecommunications company operating in eleven US states. The former owner of the Minnesota North Stars franchise, he was a member of the National Hockey League Board of Governors from 1979 to 1996, serving on all of its strategic committees.

Career
In 1979, Green joined Harley Hotchkiss, Norman Kwong, Ralph Scurfield, B.J. Seaman, and Doc Seaman in buying the Atlanta Flames of the National Hockey League and moving them to Calgary as the Calgary Flames. His name was etched on the Stanley Cup when the Flames won it in 1989.

At the NHL's request, Green sold his stock in the Flames and bought the Minnesota North Stars in 1990 from George and Gordon Gund. He was the owner of the North Stars who made the decision to move the team to Dallas, Texas in 1993 despite the team making a Cinderella run to the Stanley Cup Finals in 1991. In 1993, he moved the North Stars to Dallas, Texas, citing poor attendance in Minnesota, and the team became rechristened as the Dallas Stars.

Two years later in December 1995, amid financial problems stemming from his business ventures outside of hockey, Green was forced to sell the Dallas Stars to Tom Hicks, with the sale closing in early 1996. When the Stars won the Stanley Cup in 1999, Hicks sent Green a championship ring in honor of his services to the franchise.

Green was chairman of the Calgary Chamber of Commerce in 1977 and renovated the former Oddfellows Temple that would become the Chamber's new home. and of the Hockey Hall of Fame historical building in downtown Toronto in 1997.

Controversy
After relocating the North Stars franchise to Dallas, the team's unauthorized use of copyrighted photography owned by Minnesota photographer Frank Howard sparked a copyright infringement lawsuit that eventually led to a $65,000 settlement funded by Green.

A 1993 Sports Illustrated article stated Green was much reviled in Minnesota following the decision to move the team. Green defended his decision, citing poor attendance during a string of losing seasons and the failure to reach stadium deals in Minneapolis or Saint Paul. A sexual harassment lawsuit had also been filed against Green, and his wife threatened to leave him unless he moved the team to avoid the increasing media pressure.

Other ventures
Green was an original director and one of the principal investors in Sage Telecom, a private, telecommunications company. He was a director of TIMET and the chairman and investor in Mirage Systems, and other smaller enterprises. He has been active in philanthropic and community service activities for over 30 years. Currently, he is a member of the executive committee of the board for the Cox School of Business at Southern Methodist University and Woodall Rogers Park Foundation, and a board member of the Bank of America advisory board central division.

Personal life
Green was born in Winnipeg, Manitoba. He lives in Dallas with his wife.

References

1934 births
Living people
Calgary Flames owners
Dallas Stars executives
Minnesota North Stars executives
National Hockey League executives
National Hockey League owners
Ice hockey people from Winnipeg